Frederick William Powe (7 July 1903 – 15 March 1990) was a British politician, who served on the London County Council and Greater London Council.

Powe joined the Labour Party in his youth, and in 1928 was elected to St Pancras Metropolitan Borough Council.  At the 1937 London County Council election, he was elected in Fulham East, and served until he lost the seat in 1949.  In 1946/47, he additionally served as Mayor of St Pancras.

Powe was re-elected in the 1952 London County Council election, having switched to represent Islington South West.  In 1948, when Frank Coombes, vice chair of the council, died, Powe was elected to serve the remainder of his term.  He became the leader of St Pancras Council, on which he worked closely with the Conservative Party opposition.  By the mid-1950s, he was facing significant opposition from his backbenchers and when, in 1956, they voted to overturn an agreement he had made to nominate five Conservatives as aldermen, he resigned, to be replaced by John Lawrence.

At the 1955 and 1959 general elections, Powe stood unsuccessfully in Harrow Central.  He remained a member of London County Council until its abolition, in 1965.  He was elected to its replacement, the Greater London Council, serving until 1967.

References

1903 births
1990 deaths
Labour Party (UK) councillors
Mayors of places in Greater London
Members of the Greater London Council
Members of London County Council
Members of St Pancras Metropolitan Borough Council
Leaders of local authorities of England